Terence Knox (born December 16, 1946) is an American film, stage, and television actor. He made his debut in Robert Zemeckis's Used Cars (1980), and appeared in numerous television series, including lead roles in St. Elsewhere (1982–84) and Tour of Duty (1987–90).

Life and career
Knox was born Terry Davis in Richland, Washington, and attended Washington State University, graduating with a degree in English. He later attended Portland State University's acting graduate program, graduating with a M.F.A. degree. Prior to pursuing a career as an actor, Knox worked as a substitute teacher.

Career
Knox is perhaps best known for his roles as Dr. Peter White, the medical resident-turned rapist on St. Elsewhere, on which he appeared during that show's first three seasons (1982–84). Knox followed this with his role as Sergeant 'Zeke' Anderson on Tour of Duty. In 1992, he starred in the horror film Children of the Corn II: The Final Sacrifice, followed by a role in the television film A Mother's Right: The Elizabeth Morgan Story (1992).

He has guest-starred in other shows such as V.I.P., Pacific Blue, The Dukes of Hazzard, Murder, She Wrote and SeaQuest 2032  and has starred in several other series including All Is Forgiven, Rescue 77 and The Road Home.

He was an Inland Gloves amateur boxing champion, with 56 wins and one loss. In 2015, Knox appeared onstage in his hometown of Richland, appearing in a stage production of Ordinary People. and in Frost/Nixon in 2016.

Filmography

Film

Television

Notes

References

External links
 
 

1946 births
American male film actors
American male television actors
American male boxers
Living people
People from Richland, Washington
Portland State University alumni
Washington State University alumni
20th-century American male actors
21st-century American male actors